Barbara Lah (born 24 March 1972 in Gorizia) is an Italian triple jumper, whose personal best jump is 14.38 metres, at the 2003 World Championships in Paris. In addition she has 6.12 m in the long jump.

Biography
In 2012 sets the world record master, with the measure of 13.51, in the W40 category. In 2019 sets the world record master, with the measure of 12.30, in the W45 category.

Achievements

See also
Italian all-time lists - Triple jump
List of world records in masters athletics
List of Italian records in masters athletics

References

External links
 

1972 births
Living people
Italian female triple jumpers
Athletes (track and field) at the 1996 Summer Olympics
Olympic athletes of Italy
People from Gorizia
Italian Slovenes
Italian masters athletes
World record setters in masters athletics
Universiade medalists in athletics (track and field)
World Athletics Championships athletes for Italy
Universiade bronze medalists for Italy
Medalists at the 1995 Summer Universiade
Sportspeople from Friuli-Venezia Giulia